James Caron Butler (born March 13, 1980) is an American professional basketball coach and former player who is an assistant coach for the Miami Heat of the National Basketball Association (NBA). During a 14-year career he played for the Miami Heat, Los Angeles Lakers, Washington Wizards, Dallas Mavericks, Los Angeles Clippers, Milwaukee Bucks, Oklahoma City Thunder, Detroit Pistons, and Sacramento Kings of the National Basketball Association (NBA). Butler is a two-time NBA All-Star and was the 2002 Big East Conference Men's Basketball Player of the Year, while playing for the Connecticut Huskies.

Early life
Butler was born and raised in Racine, Wisconsin, where he suffered through a rough childhood; he was a drug dealer at age 12 and arrested 15 times before the age of 15. Butler discovered his love for basketball while at a youth detention center. Butler played in Amateur Athletic Union basketball in 1998 and 1999. After a brief career at Racine Park High School, he enrolled at Maine Central Institute where he was successful enough to receive a scholarship to attend the University of Connecticut to play for the Connecticut Huskies men's basketball team for coach Jim Calhoun for two years.

College career
As a freshman, Butler led the Huskies, only two years removed from a national championship, in both scoring and rebounding with 15.3 points per game and 7.6 rebounds per game respectively. The summer after his freshman season he started for the US team that took home gold in the 2001 FIBA World Championship for Young Men.

Butler followed his spectacular freshman campaign with an even better sophomore season, averaging 20.3 points per game and 7.5 rebounds per game, leading the Huskies to both regular season and tournament Big East titles, and was named Big East tournament MVP.  He was named co-Big East player of the year (along with Pittsburgh's Brandin Knight) and a second-team All-American. Butler led the Huskies to the Elite 8 of the NCAA basketball tournament. Despite 32 points from Butler, the Huskies lost a close game to the eventual national champion Maryland Terrapins. After the season ended, Butler declared for the NBA draft.

NBA career

Miami Heat (2002–2004)
Butler was a lottery pick in the 2002 NBA draft, selected with the 10th overall pick by the rebuilding Miami Heat. Miami would rely on Butler immediately despite being a rookie, and he would start in all 78 games he played in during the season, averaging 15.4 points, 5.1 rebounds and finished 8th in the league in steals with 1.8 per game. Despite Miami winning just 25 games and missing the playoffs, Butler proved to be a notable rookie, winning the rookie of the month awards four times during the season while also getting selected to play in the rookie challenge game at that year's All-Star weekend in Atlanta. By season's end, Butler would also be named to the first team on the NBA All-Rookie Team.  Miami would again enter the draft lottery, and this time drafted Dwyane Wade before acquiring Lamar Odom from the Los Angeles Clippers.

In the 2003–2004 season, however, Butler struggled with injuries that hampered him throughout the season, and he would go on to start in just 56 of 68 games. His scoring average fell to 9.2 points game for the season, but Miami's balanced offense led by Wade, Odom and Eddie Jones propelled Miami into the playoffs.  In the first round, the Heat faced the New Orleans Hornets and the two teams would battle in a grueling 7 games series in which the home team won every game.  In game 7, Miami closed out the series with Butler scoring 23 points with 9 rebounds.  The Heat advanced to the play the top seeded Indiana Pacers, who were heavily favored and won the first two games of the series before Miami responded with two home wins to tie the series at 2 games apiece.  Butler scored 21 points with 10 rebounds in the fourth game, but the Pacers responded to win the series in 6 games.  Following the season, Miami decided to change the roster and traded Butler, Odom and Brian Grant to the Los Angeles Lakers for superstar center Shaquille O'Neal.

Los Angeles Lakers (2004–2005)
The Lakers had been a title contender but were now in rebuilding mode, led by superstar guard Kobe Bryant.  Butler started in all of his 77 games in the 2004–2005 season, averaging 15.5 points a game with a then career high field goal percentage of 44.5% percent.  The Lakers struggled with injuries and a midseason coaching change however, and failed to make the playoffs.  Once again, the offseason meant Butler would be shipped again, as the Lakers traded him and Chucky Atkins to the Washington Wizards for Kwame Brown and Laron Profit.

Washington Wizards (2005–2010)

Upon arriving in Washington, Butler signed a 5-year, $46 million deal with the team. He became part of Washington's new "Big 3", a trio made up of teammates Gilbert Arenas and Antawn Jamison. Butler was nicknamed "Tough Juice" by coach Eddie Jordan for his aggressive and passionate play, epitomized by Butler's 20 rebounds in the Game 6 loss of opening-round series against LeBron James and the Cleveland Cavaliers.

On January 17, 2007, Butler converted his first game-winning basket, a dunk following a pass from DeShawn Stevenson with 2.2 seconds remaining against the Knicks to give the Wizards a 99–98 win. Butler was named Eastern Conference Player of the Week for January 15–21, 2007. He would have his best season yet, posting career high averages in rebounds, assists, and points. He was also named as a reserve to the 2007 NBA Eastern Conference All-Star team, his first appearance. However, he broke his hand late in the season attempting to block a shot and was forced to sit out during the playoffs along with the injured Gilbert Arenas as the Wizards were swept in their opening round rematch versus the Cavaliers.

Butler, who was sidelined with a hip injury, was selected as a reserve for the East in the 2008 NBA All-Star Game in New Orleans, Louisiana but was forced to sit out. Due to the injury, Butler missed 20 of the Wizards' last 35 games of the season. He returned to the lineup on March 13 (his 28th birthday), when the Wizards hosted the Cavaliers. He registered 19 points (8-for-18 field goals) and five rebounds in 41 minutes played in the Wizards' 101–99 win over the Cavs.

Dallas Mavericks (2010–2011)
On February 13, 2010 Butler was traded to the Dallas Mavericks along with Brendan Haywood and Deshawn Stevenson for Josh Howard, Drew Gooden, James Singleton, and Quinton Ross. The Mavericks qualified for the 2010 NBA Playoffs as the second seed in the Western Conference, but were upset in six games by the San Antonio Spurs in the first round.

On January 4, 2011, Butler was ruled out for the rest of the 2010–11 season after undergoing surgery to repair a ruptured right patellar tendon. The Mavericks went on to defeat the Miami Heat 4–2 in the 2011 NBA Finals to claim their first NBA championship.

Los Angeles Clippers (2011–2013)
On December 9, 2011, Butler signed a three-year, $24 million deal with the Los Angeles Clippers. During his two seasons as a starter with the Clippers, he helped the team reach the playoffs twice.

Milwaukee Bucks (2013–2014)
On July 10, 2013, Butler was traded to the Phoenix Suns alongside Eric Bledsoe in a three-way trade that had both Jared Dudley from the Suns and JJ Redick from the Milwaukee Bucks join the Clippers and two different second round picks being sent to the Bucks. On August 29, 2013, the Suns traded Butler to the Milwaukee Bucks for Ish Smith and Viacheslav Kravtsov. On November 22, Butler scored a game-leading 38 points, his largest single game total since 2009, during an overtime 115-107 loss to the Philadelphia 76ers.

On February 27, 2014, Butler was bought out of his contract by the Bucks, and in 34 games, he averaged 11.0 points per game.

Oklahoma City Thunder (2014)
On March 1, 2014, Butler signed with the Oklahoma City Thunder. Butler finished the season having played in 22 regular season games and 17 playoff games for the Thunder, as they qualified for the Western Conference Finals where they were defeated by the San Antonio Spurs.

Detroit Pistons (2014–2015)
On July 15, 2014, Butler signed with the Detroit Pistons to a reported two-year, $9 million contract.

On June 11, 2015, Butler was traded, along with Shawne Williams, to the Milwaukee Bucks in exchange for Ersan İlyasova. However, he was later waived by the Bucks on June 30, 2015.

Sacramento Kings (2015–2016)
On July 23, 2015, Butler signed with the Sacramento Kings. He received minimal minutes during the 2015–16 season and made just 17 appearances, averaging 3.7 points and 1.3 rebounds per game.

On June 21, 2016, Butler exercised his player option with the Kings for the 2016–17 season. However, he was later waived by the Kings on July 4, 2016, after he reached an agreement with the team to have his contract bought out.

Butler's final NBA game was on April 11, 2016 in a 105 - 101 victory over the Phoenix Suns where he recorded 7 points, 2 rebounds, 1 assist and 1 block.

Retirement
Butler announced his retirement on February 6, 2018.

Coaching career
On November 14, 2020, the Miami Heat announced that they had hired Butler as assistant coach.

Other activities
In 2015, Butler released an autobiography entitled Tuff Juice: My Journey from the Streets to the NBA. In 2019 Mark Wahlberg signed on as the executive producer of Butler's biopic of the same name.

In 2017, he participated within Global Mixed Gender Basketball (GMGB), which is the first professional basketball league to support unified play between men and women, by being a color commentator for games. He also owns a team in the newly developed league known as the Wisconsin Cheeseheads.

Also in 2017, Butler joined ESPN as full-time college basketball and NBA analyst. In 2018 Butler joined FS1 as an NBA analyst.

Personal life
Caron Butler is a Christian. After Butler was sent to a juvenile institution, he began to change his life by reading Bible verses. Butler began taking his interest in basketball seriously when he looked out his window at a basketball court at Ethan Allen Juvenile Detention. Butler spoke of it saying, "God puts stuff in front of you for a reason." Butler also said, "God put his hands on my life. [God] said, 'I'm going to touch you so that you can touch others.'"

Butler has a habit of chewing on straws, which he picked up back in AAU ball in 1998 or 1999. His straws of choice are from McDonald's. While playing for the Washington Wizards, he had an addiction to Mountain Dew. He said he drank about six 12 ounce sodas a day and would wake up in the middle of the night to have one. In his autobiography entitled Tuff Juice: My Journey from the Streets to the NBA, he states that teammates, namely Kobe Bryant, have tried to curb his Mountain Dew addiction. Butler has stated that he still struggles with his addiction to this day.

Butler attended a surprise birthday party for Anthony Fadel, a 16-year-old in the Washington, D.C. area when invited by the boy's family. The party was held in May 2007, and the event was primarily reported by Internet blogs, since Wizards PR purposely did not cover the event to preserve the sincerity of Butler's gesture.

After working at Burger King in his youth, Butler now owns six of the fast food restaurants across the United States. He has taken Business Management classes at Duke University.

Butler is the son of Mattie Claybrook Paden. His father left him when he was born to join the Marines. His mother married Melvin and he has younger brother Melvin III.

Caron and Andrea Pink Butler met at UConn's pre college summer program. After their sophomore year they traveled to Las Vegas in 2005 and married. Butler has a daughter and son from a previous relationship. With wife Andrea he has three other daughters.

NBA career statistics

Regular season

|-
| style="text-align:left;"| 
| style="text-align:left;"| Miami
| 78 || 78 || 36.6 || .416 || .318 || .824 || 5.1 || 2.7 || 1.8 || .4 || 15.4
|-
| style="text-align:left;"| 
| style="text-align:left;"| Miami
| 68 || 56 || 29.9 || .380 || .238 || .756 || 4.8 || 1.9 || 1.1 || .2 || 9.2
|-
| style="text-align:left;"| 
| style="text-align:left;"| L.A. Lakers
| 77 || 77 || 35.7 || .445 || .304 || .862 || 5.8 || 1.9 || 1.4 || .3 || 15.5
|-
| style="text-align:left;"| 
| style="text-align:left;"| Washington
| 75 || 54 || 36.1 || .455 || .342 || .870 || 6.2 || 2.5 || 1.7 || .2 || 17.6
|-
| style="text-align:left;"| 
| style="text-align:left;"| Washington
| 63 || 63 || 39.3 || .463 || .250 || .863 || 7.4 || 3.7 || 2.1 || .3 || 19.1
|-
| style="text-align:left;"| 
| style="text-align:left;"| Washington
| 58 || 58 || 39.9 || .466 || .357 || .901 || 6.7 || 4.9 || 2.2 || .3 || 20.3
|-
| style="text-align:left;"| 
| style="text-align:left;"| Washington
| 67 || 67 || 38.6 || .453 || .310 || .858 || 6.2 || 4.3 || 1.6 || .3 || 20.8
|-
| style="text-align:left;"| 
| style="text-align:left;"| Washington
| 47 || 47 || 39.4 || .422 || .263 || .877 || 6.7 || 2.3 || 1.4 || .3 || 16.9
|-
| style="text-align:left;"| 
| style="text-align:left;"| Dallas
| 27 || 27 || 34.4 || .440 || .340 || .760 || 5.4 || 1.8 || 1.8 || .3 || 15.2
|-
| style="text-align:left;background:#afe6ba;"| †
| style="text-align:left;"| Dallas
| 29 || 29 || 29.9 || .450 || .431 || .773 || 4.1 || 1.6 || 1.0 || .3 || 15.0
|-
| style="text-align:left;"| 
| style="text-align:left;"| L.A. Clippers
| 63 || 63 || 29.7 || .407 || .358 || .813 || 3.7 || 1.2 || .8 || .1 || 12.0
|-
| style="text-align:left;"| 
| style="text-align:left;"| L.A. Clippers
| 78 || 78 || 24.1 || .424 || .388 || .833 || 2.9 || 1.0 || .7 || .1 || 10.4
|-
| style="text-align:left;"| 
| style="text-align:left;"| Milwaukee
| 34 || 13 || 24.1 || .387 || .361 || .839 || 4.6 || 1.6 || .7 || .3 || 11.0
|-
| style="text-align:left;"| 
| style="text-align:left;"| Oklahoma City
| 22 || 0 || 27.2 || .409 || .441 || .842 || 3.2 || 1.2 || 1.1 || .3 || 9.7
|-
| style="text-align:left;"| 
| style="text-align:left;"| Detroit
| 78 || 21 || 20.8 || .407 || .379 || .902 || 2.5 || 1.0 || .6 || .1 || 5.9
|-
| style="text-align:left;"| 
| style="text-align:left;"| Sacramento
| 17 || 1 || 10.4 || .424 || .167 || .833 || 1.3 || 0.6 || .5 || .1 || 3.7
|-
! style="text-align:center;" colspan="2" | Career
! 881 || 732 || 32.2 || .434 || .348 || .847 || 5.0 || 2.3 || 1.3 || .2 || 14.1
|-
! style="text-align:center;" colspan="2"| All-Star
! 1 || 0 || 16.0 || .143 || .000 || .000 || 4.0 || 1.0 || .0 || .0 || 2.0

Playoffs

|-
| style="text-align:left;"| 2004
| style="text-align:left;"| Miami
| 13 || 13 || 39.3 || .386 || .182 || .825 || 8.5 || 2.4 || 2.2 || .5 || 12.8
|-
| style="text-align:left;"| 2006
| style="text-align:left;"| Washington
| 6 || 6 || 43.7 || .416 || .214 || .828 || 10.5 || 2.7 || 2.0 || .7 || 18.5
|-
| style="text-align:left;"| 2008
| style="text-align:left;"| Washington
| 6 || 6 || 41.0 || .460 || .238 || .871 || 5.7 || 3.8 || 1.8 || .2 || 18.7
|-
| style="text-align:left;"| 2010
| style="text-align:left;"| Dallas
| 6 || 6 || 33.7 || .434 || .304 || .926 || 5.8 || 1.3 || 1.5 || .8 || 19.7
|-
| style="text-align:left;"| 2012
| style="text-align:left;"| L.A. Clippers
| 10 || 10 || 26.8 || .359 || .258 || .750 || 3.0 || 1.0 || .6 || .2 || 8.6
|-
| style="text-align:left;"| 2013
| style="text-align:left;"| L.A. Clippers
| 6 || 6 || 22.7 || .478 || .250 || 1.000 || 2.7 || .0 || .3 || .3 || 8.5
|-
| style="text-align:left;"| 2014
| style="text-align:left;"| Oklahoma City
| 17 || 2 || 23.8 || .333 || .368 || .800 || 3.2 || .9 || .2 || .1 || 6.5
|-
! style="text-align:center;" colspan="2" | Career
! 64 || 49 || 31.7 || .401 || .289 || .840 || 5.3 || 1.6 || 1.1 || .3 || 11.8

References

External links

 

1980 births
Living people
African-American basketball players
African-American Christians
All-American college men's basketball players
American men's basketball players
Basketball players from Wisconsin
Dallas Mavericks players
Detroit Pistons players
Los Angeles Clippers players
Los Angeles Lakers players
Maine Central Institute alumni
Miami Heat assistant coaches
Miami Heat draft picks
Miami Heat players
Milwaukee Bucks players
National Basketball Association All-Stars
Oklahoma City Thunder players
Sacramento Kings players
Shooting guards
Small forwards
Sportspeople from Racine, Wisconsin
UConn Huskies men's basketball players
Washington Wizards players
21st-century African-American sportspeople
20th-century African-American people